Thomas Peck Farmhouse is a historic home located at Lima in Livingston County, New York. It was built about 1812 and remodeled sometime between the 1860s and 1880s. It is a two-story, five bay Federal style stone building with late 19th century Italianate and Gothic Revival inspired design features. The house is built of fieldstone and faced in cut limestone.  Also on the property are three contributing dependencies and one contributing site: a privy, an ice house, a guest / tenant house, and the remains of a former barn complex.

It was listed on the National Register of Historic Places in 1989.

References

Houses on the National Register of Historic Places in New York (state)
Gothic Revival architecture in New York (state)
Houses completed in 1812
Houses in Livingston County, New York
National Register of Historic Places in Livingston County, New York